The 4th Saturn Awards were awarded to media properties and personalities deemed by the Academy of Science Fiction, Fantasy and Horror Films to be the best in science fiction, fantasy and horror released in the year 1976. They were awarded on January 15, 1977.

The following ceremony would include actual nominees in the categories and discontinue single juried winners onward; although, there would still be honorary/special awards given to individuals annually, such as the George Pal Memorial Award and Life Career Award.

Below is a complete list of nominees and winners. Winners are highlighted in bold.

Winners and nominees

References

External links
 Official website
 4th Saturn Awards at IMDb

Saturn
Saturn Awards ceremonies